The 2018 Men's Hockey Düsseldorf Masters was the twenty-third edition of the Hamburg Masters, an international men's field hockey tournament, consisting of a series of test matches. It was be held in  Düsseldorf, Germany, from July 26 to 29, 2018, and featured four of the top nations in men's field hockey.

Competition format
The tournament featured the national teams of Argentina, France, Ireland, and the hosts, Germany, competing in a round-robin format, with each team playing each other once. Three points were awarded for a win, one for a draw, and none for a loss.

Results

Matches

Statistics

Goalscorers
5 Goals

  Timm Herzbruch 

4 Goals

  Niklas Wellen 

2 Goals

  Martin Ferreiro 
  Gonzalo Peillat 
  Mats Grambusch 
  Charles Masson 

1 Goal

  Guido Barreiros 
  Agustin Mazzilli 
  Joaquín Menini 
  Nahuel Salis 
  Johannes Große 
  Lukas Windfeder
  Aristide Coisne  
  Hugo Genestet 
  Matthew Bell 
  Lee Cole 
  Stuart Loughrey

References

2018
Men
2018 in German sport
2018 in Argentine sport
2018 in French sport
2018 in Irish sport
Sport in Düsseldorf
July 2018 sports events in Germany
2010s in Düsseldorf